The Roedern Affair is a 1944 German historical drama film directed by Erich Waschneck and starring Paul Hartmann, Annelies Reinhold and Rudolf Fernau. It is part of the tradition of Prussian films.

The film's sets were designed by the art director Heinrich Beisenherz and Alfred Bütow. It was shot at the Althoff Studios in Berlin and on location in Potsdam.

Cast
 Paul Hartmann as Festungsbaumeister Dietrich von Roedern
 Annelies Reinhold as Sängerin Maria Raven
 Clementia Egies as Elisabeth von Roedern
 Rudolf Fernau as Graf Wengen
 Karl Dannemann as Soldat Knuse
 Franz Schafheitlin as Marquis d'Orion
 Herbert Hübner as General von Krusemarck
 Hans Leibelt as Hofmarschall
 Inge Drexel as Zofe Jeanette
 Hugo Werner-Kahle as Herzog von Braunschweig
 Ursula Herking as Marias Dienerin Luise
 Karl Günther as Major von Moder
 Werner Schott as Oberst von Sack
 Otz Tollen as Herr von Sponseck
 Elfie Dugall as Liese
 Otto Hüsch as Theseus

References

Bibliography 
 Bruce Murray & Christopher J. Wickham. Framing the Past: The Historiography of German Cinema and Television. SIU Press, 1992.

External links 
 

1944 films
1940s historical drama films
German historical drama films
Films of Nazi Germany
1940s German-language films
Films directed by Erich Waschneck
German black-and-white films
Films set in Berlin
Films set in the 1750s
Seven Years' War films
Films shot at Althoff Studios
Prussian films
1944 drama films
1940s German films